Oktyabrsky is a rural locality (a settlement) in Pyatovskoye Rural Settlement, Totemsky District, Vologda Oblast, Russia. The population was 255 as of 2002. There are 7 streets.

Geography 
Oktyabrsky is located 23 km northwest of Totma (the district's administrative centre) by road. Pustosh is the nearest rural locality.

References 

Rural localities in Totemsky District